Chikkankod is a village located in Honavar Tehsil of Uttara Kannada district in Karnataka, India. It is situated 13 km away from the sub-district headquarters Honnavar and 103 km away from the district headquarters Karwar. As of 2009, Chikkankod is also a gram panchayat.

Nearest places
Chikkankod village is 12 kilometres away from Honnavar town. The total geographical area of Chikkankod is 273.6 hectares. Chikkankod has a total population of 1,856 people (as of 2011). There are about 426 houses in Chikkankod.

References

Villages in Uttara Kannada district